Henry Howard (1818–1884) was an Irish-born American architect. Over the course of four decades, he designed over 280 buildings in Louisiana, including several plantation houses during the antebellum era. After the Civil War, he designed many town houses in New Orleans.

Early life
Henry Howard was born on February 8, 1818, in Cork, Ireland. Here he learned the architectural trade at his father's architectural office. He emigrated to the United States in 1836, first living in New York City. Within a year, he joined his brother in New Orleans, Louisiana.

Career
Howard first worked as a builder/carpenter in New Orleans, where he built residential stairs. He was employed by architects James H. Dakin and Henry Molhausen. A few years later, he completed the Pontalba Buildings, started by James Gallier.

 

By 1848, he designed the Madewood Plantation House near Napoleonville. He went on to design several other plantation mansions, such as Nottoway (1859, the largest surviving plantation house in the South), Belle Alliance, Indian Camp Plantation (1859), Belmont Plantation in St. James Parish, and Edgewood (1859) in Natchez, Mississippi .

Howard also designed town houses like the Samuel W. Logan House, the Robert H. Short House and the Goldsmith-Godchaux House (1859). The Goldsmith-Godchaux House is "significant for its painted interiors. Has more fresco wall decoration and stenciling than probably any other mid-nineteenth century residence in the South."

In at least a few of these projects, Howard worked with a partner, Albert Diettel, including Edgewood and possibly Indian Camp Plantation.

During the American Civil War of 1861-1865, Howard joined the Confederate States Navy and worked at the Confederate Naval Iron Works in Columbus, Georgia.

After the war, Howard resumed designing houses. Over the course of his career, he designed over 280 buildings, some of which were wrongly attributed to James Gallier.

Other works
Belle Grove Plantation, Iberville Parish, Louisiana
Carrollton Courthouse, New Orleans
White Hall Plantation House, Pointe Coupee Parish

Personal life and death
Howard married Miss Richards of New York; they had 11 children. He died of paralysis on November 25, 1884, in New Orleans.

Further reading

References

External links
Henry Howard in Louisiana Historical Association's Dictionary of Louisiana Biography

1818 births
1884 deaths
People from Cork (city)
Architects from New Orleans
Irish emigrants to the United States (before 1923)
19th-century Irish architects
19th-century American architects
Confederate States Navy personnel
Foreign Confederate military personnel